Sylfaen  is a Welsh word meaning foundation. It may refer to:

 Sylfaen (typeface), a serif font family
 Sylfaen railway station, in Sylfaen, Powys, Wales
 Sylfaen, Powys, the town where the station is located